The Asahi Ryokuken International Championship was a golf tournament for professional female golfers that was part of the LPGA Tour from 2001 through 2004. It was played at the Mount Vintage Plantation Golf Club in North Augusta, South Carolina. 

The first major professional golf tournament owned by African Americans Larry and John Fridie.  The brothers partnered with Japanese-American Cappy Harada. They selected Mount Vintage Golf course in North Augusta, South Carolina as the official home of the tournament. In partnership with Bettis Rainsford the owner of Mt. Vintage they partnered and conducted the first tournament just days after 9/11 2001. Cappy Harada introduced Asahi Ryokuken of Japan as the official sponsor of the 1.2 million dollar prize for the winner. The tournament was broadcast on ESPN. The last tournament was held in October 2004.  Tina Fischer of Germany was the first winner

Winners

The 2001 tournament was shortened to 54 holes due to rain.

Tournament record

External links
LPGA official microsite

Former LPGA Tour events
Golf in South Carolina
Recurring sporting events established in 2001
Recurring sporting events disestablished in 2004
2001 establishments in South Carolina
2004 disestablishments in South Carolina
Women's sports in South Carolina